The Scrap Yard Fast Pitch was an independent women's professional softball team based in Conroe, Texas, just north of Houston.  Established in October 2015 as the Scrap Yard Dawgs, the team played in the National Pro Fastpitch (NPF) during the 2016 and 2017 seasons.  The Dawgs were the first NPF team to be based in the Houston area since the Texas Thunder became the Rockford Thunder in the 2007 season. In 2017, the Dawgs won their first NPF title against Pride in the best of three game series.

After having its franchise terminated by the NPF, the team went independent under the name Scrap Yard Fast Pitch.

In June 2020, all eighteen of the team's players quit in protest of a tweet by the franchise owner. Days later, the team became "This Is Us" and continued their series against the USSSA Pride.

Although the team has since disbanded, the facilities are still maintained by Scrap Yard Sports, which also runs recreational softball and baseball leagues.

History
On October 23, 2015, NPF announced the Scrap Yards Dawgs as an expansion team for the 2016 season.  Kevin Shelton, also the general manager of the Dallas Charge, was introduced as the Dawgs' GM.

On May 5, 2016, the Dawgs signed free agent Monica Abbott to a six-year contract, believed to be worth $1 million; the contract was believed to be the most lucrative paid by an individual American professional franchise to an active female athlete in any team sport.

2017
For the 2017 season, the Dawgs hired Texas A&M associate head coach Gerry Glasco as their head coach.  Glasco's assistants would be Oregon's Jimmy Kolaitis and Joe Guthrie of Bucknell.  Glasco was head coach of the USSSA Pride in 2014. Kolaitis was an assistant coach for the Chicago Bandits in 2013. The Dawgs finished second during the regular season and won the 2017 Cowles Cup Championship.

2018
On January 28, the Dawgs announced via press release they would no longer be affiliated with the NPF. The NPF terminated their franchise on January 29 citing that the team had violated several league operating rules and franchise requirements. The team indicated they would continue as an independent team under the name Scrap Yard Fastpitch.

2020
In June 2020, during the George Floyd protests and after the first game of a planned seven-game series, franchise owner Connie May tweeted a photo of players standing with hands on heart captioned "Everyone respecting the flag," a reference to the U.S. national anthem protests. May tagged President and protest critic Donald Trump in the tweet. All eighteen players quit the team. The players vowed to never play for Scrap Yard again and formed a new team tentatively named This Is Us. Scrapping together donated uniforms, the players returned to the field days later, defeating the USSSA Pride. Coach Michael Steuerwald and several former Scrap Yard staffers remained with the new team.

Team

General managers
 Kevin Shelton (2015)
 Connie May (2016–present)

Current roster

All-time head coaches

Season-by-season 

|-
|align=center|2016 || 29 || 19 || 0 || 2nd place National Pro Fastpitch || Lost to Chicago Bandits 2-games-to-1 in NPF Semifinals 
|-
|align=center|2017 || 31 || 18 || 0 || 2nd place National Pro Fastpitch || Won NPF Championship 2-games-to-1 over USSSA Pride, Defeated Akron Racers 2-games-to-0 in NPF Semifinals
|-
!Totals || 60|| 37 || 0
|colspan="2"|

Draft history

NPF Draft

References

External links 
Scrap Yard Fastpitch website

  
 

 

Softball in Texas
Softball teams
Scrap Yard Dawgs
National Pro Fastpitch teams
2015 establishments in Texas
Sports clubs established in 2015
Conroe, Texas